Hugh Robert Mill  (28 May 1861 – 5 April 1950) was a British geographer and meteorologist who was influential in the reform of geography teaching, and in the development of meteorology as a science. He was President of the Royal Meteorological Society for 1907/8, and President of the Geographical Association in 1932.

Life
He was born in Thurso, the son of Dr James Mill.

He was educated locally then studied Sciences at the University of Edinburgh, graduating in 1883. In 1884 he was appointed chemist and physicist to the Scottish marine station, and in 1887 became a lecturer for the university extension movement, being at the same time (1893-9) recorder of the geographical section of the British Association. He became president of the geographical section in 1901. In 1892 he was appointed librarian to the Royal Geographical Society in London. From 1902 to 1906, he was honorary secretary of the Royal Meteorological Society, and became its president in 1907.

In 1890 he lived on Braid Road in south Edinburgh.

Mill served on many committees connected with meteorology and allied subjects, including the International Council for the study of the sea (1901-8), and the Board of Trade committee on the water power of the British Isles (1918). In 1901, he became director of the British Rainfall Organization, and editor of British Rainfall and Symons's Meteorological Magazine. When the British Rainfall Organization was converted into a trust in 1910, he became chairman of trustees, a position from which he retired in 1919. From 1906 to 1919 he was rainfall expert to the Metropolitan Water Board.

In 1885 he was elected a Fellow of the Royal Society of Edinburgh. His proposers were Sir John Murray, Alexander Buchan, David Milne Home and Peter Guthrie Tait. He won the Society's Makdougall Brisbane Prize for the period 1890-92. In November 1891 he was elected a Fellow of the Royal Geographical Society.

He held the post of secretary to the Royal Geographical Society during the Society's involvement with the leading British Antarctic expeditions of the late 19th and early 20th centuries. He was a friend and confidant to Scott, Shackleton, and especially to William Speirs Bruce, who led the Scottish National Antarctic Expedition, 1902–04. He initiated Bruce's move from medicine to polar research by recommending him to the Dundee Whaling Expedition to the Antarctic, 1892–93, and to other Arctic expeditions. In 1923 he produced the first full-length biography of Shackleton.

Mill received the honorary degree Doctor of laws (LL.D.) from the University of St Andrews in 1900. He received the Victoria Medal of the Royal Geographical Society (1915), the Symons Medal of the Royal Meteorological Society (1918), the Gold Medal of the Royal Scottish Geographical Society (1924) and the Cullum Geographical Medal (1929) of the American Geographical Society. In 1885, he was elected fellow of the Royal Society of Edinburgh, and in 1936, he was elected member of the Academy of Sciences Leopoldina.

Recognition

Family
He was married twice: in 1889 to Frances McDonald; and in 1937 to Alfreda Dransfield.

Notes and references

Sources

Speak, Peter: William Speirs Bruce, Polar Explorer and Scottish Nationalist National Museums of Scotland Publishing, Edinburgh 2003

External links

1861 births
1950 deaths
Fellows of the Royal Society of Edinburgh
Fellows of the Royal Geographical Society
People from Thurso
Alumni of the University of Edinburgh
Presidents of the Royal Meteorological Society
Recipients of the Cullum Geographical Medal
Scottish meteorologists
Scottish scientists
Victoria Medal recipients